Oswaldo Carlos Blanco Díaz (born September 8, 1945) is a former Major League Baseball first baseman. He batted and threw right-handed.

Blanco posted a .196 batting average in 52 games for the Chicago White Sox in 1970 and the Cleveland Indians in 1974. He was traded along with José Ortiz by the White Sox to the Chicago Cubs for Dave Lemonds, Roe Skidmore and Pat Jacquez on November 30, 1970.

In 2015, he was enshrined into the Venezuelan Baseball Hall of Fame and Museum.

See also
 List of players from Venezuela in Major League Baseball

Sources

External links
, or Retrosheet
Mexican Baseball League statistics
Venezuelan Professional Baseball League statistics

1945 births
Living people
Águilas del Zulia players
Birmingham A's players
Cafeteros de Córdoba players
Caracas Metropolitanos players
Chicago White Sox players
Cleveland Indians players
Decatur Commodores players
Diablos Rojos del México players
Estrellas Orientales (VPBL) players
Evansville White Sox players
Indios de Ciudad Juárez (minor league) players
Indios de Oriente players
Leesburg A's players
Lewiston Broncs players
Lexington Giants players
Llaneros de Acarigua players
Llaneros de Portuguesa players
Major League Baseball first basemen
Major League Baseball players from Venezuela
Mexican League baseball players
Mobile White Sox players
Modesto Reds players
Navegantes del Magallanes players
Oklahoma City 89ers players
People from Caracas
Pericos de Puebla players
Syracuse Chiefs players
Tacoma Cubs players
Tiburones de La Guaira players
Tucson Toros players
Vancouver Mounties players
Venezuelan expatriate baseball players in Canada
Venezuelan expatriate baseball players in Mexico
Venezuelan expatriate baseball players in the United States
Wichita Aeros players